Emilio Estrada Carmona (28 May 1855 – 21 December 1911) was President of Ecuador from 1 September until his death from a heart attack on 21 December 1911.

References

Emilio Estrada Carmona. diccionariobiograficoecuador.com
 Emilio Estrada C. at estrada.bz
  Enciclopedia del Ecuador por Efrén Avilés Pino

1855 births
1911 deaths
Presidents of Ecuador